Beverly Smith is an American softball coach who is the current head coach at South Carolina.

Coaching career

South Carolina
On July 15, 2010, Beverly Smith was announced as the new head coach of the South Carolina softball program, replacing longtime head coach Joyce Compton.

Head coaching record

College

References

Living people
Female sports coaches
American softball coaches
Year of birth missing (living people)
North Carolina Tar Heels softball players
North Carolina Tar Heels softball coaches
South Carolina Gamecocks softball coaches